Glenn Jenks (February 9, 1947 –  January 21, 2016) was an American ragtime pianist, composer and music historian.

Career and life
Jenks was a "prolific ragtime composer, teacher and performer from Maine who fused traditional ragtime with classical music themes". He attended the New England Conservatory before going on to receive a degree in music from Earlham College, graduating Phi Beta Kappa. Jenks toured with singer-songwriter Jud Strunk between 1975 and 1978. He also performed with such acts as Manhattan Transfer, Dick Hyman, Gordon Bok, Doc Watson and Andy Williams. In 1978, Jenks began his solo performing career and in 1979 released his first album entitled Antidote on the Bonnie Banks record label.

Throughout the 1980s, Jenks served as pianist for the New England Vaudeville Review, the New Vaudeville Revival, and husband and wife dance duo Tony and Karen Montanaro. Jenks was an original founding member of numerous ragtime festivals and between 1989 and 2000 he produced the Harvest Ragtime Revue in Camden, Maine. Jenks was a noted ornithologist and botany specialist on roses who conducted tours of gardens throughout the Camden area. He founded the annual Rose Day celebration at the Merryspring Nature Center.

Jenks was commissioned by Down East Singers to compose Heaven and Earth are Full of Thy Glory for their concert tour of Russia. His String Quartet in Ragtime has been recorded and performed by several string quartets including the Laurentian Quartet, Vancadium Quartet and the Halcyon Quartet.

Jenks died on January 21, 2016, in Portland, Maine.

Legacy
In 2019, the Glenn Jenks Ragtime Revue premiered at the Camden Opera House in Camden, Maine. The Revue revived a tradition that Jenks started 30 years prior which brought nationally-known artists together in "song, dance, humor and ragtime." The Revue has presented awards to various ragtime performers including Sue Keller, Edward A. Berlin and Max Morath. It also sponsors the "Glenn Jenks Future in Music Prize" in association with the Bay Chamber Concerts and Music School in Rockport, Maine.

In 2020, a collection of Jenk’s complete rags for piano was released.

Discography

Music publications
 Jenks, Glenn (1993). A Garden of Ragtime, Squanlake Music. 68 pages.
Jenks, Glenn (2020). The Complete Ragtime Works For Piano by Glenn Jenks. 265 pages.

References

External links
 
 Maine Public Radio: An Exploration of Ragtime - Glenn Jenks
 List of Piano Compositions

1947 births
American male classical composers
American classical composers
Ragtime composers
People from Camden, Maine
Musicians from Maine
Boston Conservatory at Berklee alumni
Earlham College alumni
American music historians
2016 deaths